WTOR (770 AM, branded as e:Awaz) is a daytime-only radio station licensed to Youngstown, New York, United States and serving the Golden Horseshoe of Ontario, Canada. The station is owned by Birach Broadcasting Corporation and operated by Canadian businesswoman Arifa Muzaffar under a local marketing agreement (LMA). All programming originates from studios in Mississauga, Ontario, which is sent to the station in Youngstown, then blasted back across the border to Toronto (in an example of rimshotting).

e:Awaz airs as a brokered multicultural radio format targeted primarily at the Pakistani Canadian and Punjabi Canadian community in Greater Toronto Area and Niagara Peninsula in Canada. The station's programming is primarily in Punjabi and Urdu. Some programs are aimed at Sikhs and other religious and ethnic groups from South Asia. Birach Broadcasting maintains nominal ownership of the station to meet FCC regulations that prohibit foreign nationals from owning controlling stakes in U.S. radio licenses.

WTOR is a daytime-only station, signing off at sunset to protect 50,000-watt Class A clear-channel station WABC in New York City.  WTOR's 13,000-watt directional signal is aimed almost completely into the province of Ontario. (Canada ceased licensing daytime-only stations after the last such daytime, CKOT, signed off in 2013; this is a possible reason the station remains licensed in the U.S. instead of Canada as a legal fiction.) The transmitter is located off Langdon Road in Ransomville, New York, and a landline phone and a largely unused but official "main studio" are located at the transmitter site.

The WTOR call sign refers to TORonto, the target city.  The call letters previously belonged to a station in Torrington, Connecticut which now uses the call sign WSNG.

References

External links
Official website
WTOR station profile from Birach Broadcasting Corporation's website

TOR
Radio stations established in 1991
Multicultural and ethnic radio stations in Canada
Punjabi-language radio stations
Urdu-language radio stations
TOR
Urdu-language mass media in the United States
Birach Broadcasting Corporation stations
1991 establishments in New York (state)
TOR